LZK may refer to:

 LZK (Latvia) ( or Latvian News Channel), a former TV channel in Latvia
 An alias for the MAP3K13 enzyme
 , a former Polish manufacturer of film projectors
 The Doppler radar code of the National Weather Service North Little Rock, Arkansas

See also
 LZKZ